Jacobus Petrus Adriaanse (born 19 July 1985) is a former South African rugby union player that played first class rugby between 2008 and 2019 and represented the Emerging Springboks internationally. His regular position is tighthead prop.

Rugby career

Youth

Adriaanse represented Western Cape side Boland at various level throughout his school career, from Under-12 level in 1997 to Under-16 level in 2001. He was included in Western Province's Under-18 Craven Week team that won the main match at the 2002 event in Pietermaritzburg and was also included in a South Africa Under-19 training squad after the tournament.

Adriaanse made the cut for the final South African Under-19 squad that played at the 2003 Under-19 Rugby World Championship held in Paris, despite still being in the Under-18 age group. He helped South Africa win the tournament, beating New Zealand's Under-19 team 22–18 in the final. He returned to South Africa, where he was once again included in Western Province's Under=18 Craven Week squad that played at the 2003 edition held in Wellington. He helped Western Province win the unofficial final of the competition for the second season in a row, and was included in a South African Schools Academy side that was named at the conclusion of the tournament and played one match against a France Under-18 side in Johannesburg.

Adriaanse was again selected in the South African Under-19 training group in 2003 and made the final squad for the 2004 Under-19 Rugby World Championship which took place in Durban. The team couldn't defend their title, losing to New Zealand in the semifinal, but bounced back to beat England in the third-place play-off. In the latter half of 2004, Adriaanse represented Western Province team in the Under-20 Provincial Championship.

Maties / Western Province / Emerging Springboks

In 2005 and 2006, Adriaanse represented  in the Under-21 Provincial Championship and also played club rugby for Stellenbosch University – also known as  – between 2005 and 2008. He was included in a training squad for the South Africa Under-21 team in January 2006, but failed to make the final squad that played at the 2006 Under-21 Rugby World Championship. He was included in the  squad for the 2007 Vodacom Cup competition, but was didn't make any appearances in the competition. In 2008, Adriaanse represented Maties in the inaugural edition of the Varsity Cup. He made eight appearances in the competition, including their semi-final match – where they beat  47–44 – and the final, where Maties was crowned the first champions of the competition by beating Western Cape rivals . Once again, Adriaanse was included in the Western Province squad for the Vodacom Cup, but didn't feature in any matches.

However, Adriaanse was included in an Emerging Springboks squad that played in the 2008 IRB Nations Cup held in Romania.

Boland Cavaliers

Adriaanse linked up with Wellington-based side  after returning home from the 2008 IRB Nations Cup. He again played off the bench in their next match against  and against  in Round Ten of the competition. He was promoted to the starting line-up for next match, a 19–69 defeat to the Blue Bulls, where he remained for the remaining three matches in the competition. Adriaanse started their convincing 54–15 victory in the first leg, as well as the second leg, which the Boland Cavaliers lost 42–50, but still retained their Premier League status.

Adriaanse didn't feature for the Boland Cavaliers in the 2009 Vodacom Cup, but firmly established himself as their first choice tighthead prop for the 2009 Currie Cup Premier Division, starting eleven of their fourteen matches in the competition and appearing as a replacement on one occasion. Adriaanse started both legs of the relegation series; despite Boland Cavaliers winning the first leg 36–35 in Wellington, they lost the second leg 3–40 in Witbank to be relegated to the First Division for 2010.

Griquas

Following the Boland Cavaliers' relegation to the First Division, Adriaanse moved to Kimberley to join  on a one-year contract. He helped defending champions Griquas qualify for the title play-offs after finishing in third place in the Northern Section of the competition, but they were eliminated at the quarter final stage, losing 24–28 to a  side. That match also saw Adriaanse score the first try of his career, scoring just after half time to help Griquas to a 26–20 victory. Adriaanse made six starts and seven appearances as a replacement during the competition, as Griquas finished in sixth position on the log.

Golden Lions / Lions

At the conclusion of his one-year deal with Griquas, Adriaanse was on the move again, joining Johannesburg-based side the  prior to the 2011 season. He reverted to the Vodacom Cup side for their quarter final defeat to the  before returning to the Super Rugby side for four more substitute appearances.

The Golden Lions finished top of the log after the round-robin stage, winning ten of their matches.

He made eight appearances in the round-robin stage of the 2012 Currie Cup Premier Division in the latter half of the year, but once again tasted play-off defeat to Western Province as the side from Cape Town won 21–16 in the semi-final.

Scarlets

The semi-final match was Adriaanse's final match in a Golden Lions shirt, as he signed for Welsh Pro12 side Scarlets on a three-year deal. He made his debut for Scarlets by starting in their 18–34 defeat to Worcester Warriors in the First Round of the 2012–13 Anglo-Welsh Cup. He featured in their next match in the same competition a week later against the Cardiff Blues to make his home debut for his new side. On 25 November 2012, he made his first appearance in the 2012–13 Pro12 competition, as he helped the Scarlets get their first-ever victory over Munster at Musgrave Park. He eventually made ten appearances in the competition, culminating in a semi-final appearance against Ulster, which the Scarlets lost 17–28 to be knocked out of the competition.

Adriaanse again featured in all three competitions during the 2013–14 season. He played in thirteen matches in the 2013–14 Pro12 competition, as the Scarlets could not emulate their records from the previous season, failing to quality for the semi-finals. They had a far better record in the 2013–14 Heineken Cup than the previous season though, winning two and drawing one of their six matches, with Adriaanse appearing in four of those. He also made two appearances during the 2013–14 Anglo-Welsh Cup, with Scarlets winning two of their four matches to fail to quality to the semi-finals.

The 2014–15 season saw him slip down the pecking order in the Scarlets ranks; he made eleven appearances during the 2014–15 Pro12, but only started one of those against Glasgow Warriors. He was used as a replacement on one occasion in the 2014–15 Heineken Cup – in a match against Leicester Tigers – and made two appearances in the 2014–15 Anglo-Welsh Cup. Due to lack of game time for the Scarlets, he also appeared in the Welsh Premier Division, making one appearance for Llandovery and two appearances for Carmarthen Quins.

Adriaanse left Scarlets at the end of the 2014–2015 season, having made 51 appearances for the side, but never scored any tries during his time in Wales.

Montpellier

Shortly after playing his final match for the Scarlets, it was announced that Adriaanse would join French Top 14 side . He signed a short-term deal running until 31 October 2015 to provide cover for the senior team during the 2015 Rugby World Cup.

Kings

Adriaanse returned to South Africa to join the Port Elizabeth-based  prior to the 2016 Super Rugby season.

Bulls

After just one season at the Kings, Adriaanse moved to Pretoria to join the  prior to the 2016 Currie Cup Premier Division season.

Statistics

Personal life

Adriaanse is the older brother of South African international prop Lourens Adriaanse.

References

South African rugby union players
Living people
1985 births
Rugby union players from Cape Town
Afrikaner people
South African people of Dutch descent
Stellenbosch University alumni
South African expatriate rugby union players
Expatriate rugby union players in Wales
South African expatriate sportspeople in Wales
Rugby union props
Boland Cavaliers players
Golden Lions players
Griquas (rugby union) players
Lions (United Rugby Championship) players
Scarlets players
Llandovery RFC players
Southern Kings players
South African expatriate sportspeople in France
Expatriate rugby union players in France
Montpellier Hérault Rugby players